The 1899 Columbia Blue and White football team was an American football team that represented Columbia University as an independent during the 1899 college football season.  In its first season under head coach George Sanford, the team compiled a 9–3 record and outscored opponents by a total of  including eight shutouts. The 1899 season marked Columbia's return to the sport after not participating in intercollegiate football from 1892  to 1898. Robert R. Wilson was the 1899 team captain.

On October 28, 1899, Columbia defeated Yale, 5–0. The result was described by The New York Times as "one of the most disastrous defeats Yale has ever experienced in her athletic history." Columbia's freshman back Harold Weekes scored the game's only points on a long touchdown run in the middle of the second half.

Three Columbia received honors on the 1899 All-America team: center Jack Wright (Walter Camp second team; New York Sun first team); Weekes (Walter Camp second team); and back Bill Morley (Outing Magazine second team).

Columbia's sports teams were commonly called the "Blue and White" in this era, but had no official nickname. The name "Lions" would not be adopted until 1910.

The team played its home games at Manhattan Field, also known as Polo Grounds II, in Upper Manhattan in New York City.

Schedule

References

Columbia
Columbia Lions football seasons
Columbia Blue and White football